The von Karman Gas Dynamics Facility at Arnold Engineering Development Complex, Arnold Air Force Base, Tennessee, provide aerothermal ground test simulations of hypersonic flight over a wide range of velocities and pressure altitudes. The facility consists of three Hypersonic wind tunnels:  Tunnel A, B, and C. The wind tunnels can be run for several hours at a time thanks to a 92,500 horsepower air compressor plant system.  The test unit is owned by the United States Air Force and operated by National Aerospace Solutions.

Tunnel A 
Tunnel A is a 48-inch squared, continuous, closed-circuit, variable density, supersonic wind tunnel with a Mach number range of 1.5 to 5.5 with a maximum temperature of 290 degrees Fahrenheit. Devoted primarily to explorations of aerodynamic design, Tunnel A's unique feature is its computer controlled continuous-curvature nozzle that can vary the tunnel's Mach number.

Tunnel B 
Tunnel B is a 50-inch, closed-circuit hypersonic tunnel with continuous-flow capability with a Mach number capability of 6 and 8. Provided with air heated to a maximum of 900 degrees Fahrenheit with natural gas-fired heaters. Tunnel B is also primarily explores aerodynamic design.

Tunnel C 
Tunnel C is a continuous-flow tunnel with a Mach number capability of 4, 6, and 10. It offers an aerothermal environment for testing materials proposed for use on space vehicles and aircraft. The one-of-a-kind wind tunnel makes it possible to subject flight hardware to a combination aerodynamic and thermodynamic—or heating—effects up to 1,440 degrees Fahrenheit so engineers can study how aerospace vehicles and material response to the combined effects of external heating, internal heat conduction and pressure loading.

References

External links
Arnold Engineering Development Center (official)
VKF Fact Sheet

Wind tunnels
Research installations of the United States Air Force
Military in Tennessee